John Melvin "Deep" Friesz (pronounced "Freeze") (born May 19, 1967) is a former professional football player, a quarterback in the National Football League (NFL) for four teams. Selected in the 1990 NFL Draft by the San Diego Chargers, he later played for the Washington Redskins, Seattle Seahawks, and New England Patriots.

Early life
Born in Missoula, Montana, Friesz moved with his family in 1975 to Coeur d'Alene, Idaho; he attended Coeur d'Alene High School and graduated in 1985.  Friesz spent two seasons as a back-up; as a sophomore, he was third-string behind senior Steve Halliday and junior Scott Wellman as the Vikings won their first state title in 1982. The next year, CDA was state runner-up behind   the starter in his senior season in 1984.

His first game was against perennial state power Borah in Boise, who had beaten the Vikings  at Coeur d'Alene in 1983. The #2-ranked CDA Vikings returned the favor and beat the Lions 19–14 on the then-green AstroTurf of Bronco Stadium. Friesz completed 21 of 40 passes for 260 yards and two touchdowns in his starting debut. The Vikings took over the top spot in the state poll and beat Rogers of Spokane 46–0 the following week. They won their first ten games, but lost in the state semifinals 25–20 to Capital, who also had handed them their last loss, at the finals in 1983. The game was played at a neutral site, the Kibbie Dome in Moscow, Friesz's future home field. He finished the season with over 1,900 yards passing and 19 touchdowns in eleven games, and was second-team  (CDA won the state title the following year with Duane Halliday at quarterback.)

Friesz enrolled at the University of Idaho, recruited by head coach Dennis Erickson, after attending the coach's Vandal football camp in the summer of 1984. Lightly recruited, his only other offer was from New Mexico, at the time a struggling program in the Western Athletic Conference. Friesz had been turned down by Big Sky member Weber State, then coached by Mike Price.

College career
Friesz redshirted in 1985 as the Vandals won their first outright Big Sky Conference title since 1971. In 1986, under new head coach Keith Gilbertson, he served as the backup to Scott Linehan, who would go on to become head coach of the St. Louis Rams.

Friesz was the Vandals starting quarterback for three years, beginning in 1987, when he threw 28 touchdown passes as a sophomore and was named player of the year in the Big Sky and second-team All-American (Division I-AA).  In his junior season of 1988, he guided the Vandals to a 9–1 regular season and two playoff wins, ending the season with a road loss in the Division I-AA semi-finals.  He was a consensus All-American selection 

In his senior season in 1989, Freisz threw 31 touchdowns and for over 4,000 yards in guiding the Vandals to their third consecutive conference championship.  Idaho went undefeated in conference play (8–0), the only time in school history.  Friesz averaged over 360 yards per game and passed for over 300 yards in ten consecutive games.  He received the Walter Payton Award as the outstanding player in the nation in Division I-AA.

In his college career, #17 passed for over 10,000 yards and was the conference player-of-the-year for three consecutive years.  The Vandals' annual MVP award has been renamed the John Friesz Award in his honor.

In August 2006, Friesz was inducted into the College Football Hall of Fame in South Bend, Indiana.  His #17 was officially retired by the University of Idaho in October 2006. The same number was retired by his high school in 1991.

Professional career

In the 1990 NFL Draft, Friesz was the tenth quarterback selected, taken in the sixth round (138th overall) by the San Diego Chargers.  Other quarterbacks in this draft were Jeff George (#1 overall pick), Heisman Trophy winner Andre Ware, future Super Bowl starter Neil O'Donnell, and Scott Mitchell.

Friesz became the starting quarterback for the Chargers in 1991, his second season.  He suffered a season-ending knee injury in a pre-season game in 1992. The Chargers then acquired QB Stan Humphries from the Washington Redskins, who was drafted by then Redskins GM Bobby Beathard, who was the Chargers GM at that time. Humphries became the starting QB and led the Chargers, who were winless in their first four games, to an 11–5 record, ending a ten-year playoff drought and winning their first AFC West Division title since 1981 under rookie coach Bobby Ross. Friesz returned to the Chargers the next season as the backup quarterback and left the Chargers as a free agent prior to the 1994 season.

Friesz passed for over 8,600 yards and 45 touchdowns in his professional career.

NFL career statistics

References

External links
 
 Idaho Vandal Athletics Hall of Fame profile
 

1967 births
Living people
American football quarterbacks
San Diego Chargers players
Washington Redskins players
Seattle Seahawks players
New England Patriots players
Idaho Vandals football players
Walter Payton Award winners
College Football Hall of Fame inductees
People from Coeur d'Alene, Idaho
Players of American football from Montana
Sportspeople from Missoula, Montana
Players of American football from Idaho